Shri Krishna, also known as Krishna is an Indian Hindi-language television historical series, created, written and directed by Ramanand Sagar. It is an adaptation of the stories of the life of Krishna, based on Bhagavata Purana, Brahma Vaivarta Purana, Harivamsa, Vishnu Purana, Padma Purana, Garga Samhita, Bhagavad Gita and Mahabharata.

Cast
 Sarvadaman D. Banerjee as Krishna / Vishnu/ Narayana
Swapnil Joshi as teenage Krishna
Ashok Kumar Balkrishnan as child Krishna
Palak as child Krishna
 Deepak Deulkar as Balram / Sheshanag
 Sanjeev Sharma as Teenage Balram
 Pinky Parikh as Rukmini / Yamuna / Lakshmi / Durga
 Reshma Modi as Radha
 Shweta Rastogi as Teenage Radha
 Paulomi Mukherjee as Devaki
 Sunil Pandey as Vasudeva
 Damini Kanwal Shetty (Seema Kanwal) as Yashoda
 Sulakshana Khatri as Rohini Devi
 Shahnawaz Pradhan as Nanda Baba / Shurasena / Chanoor / Maha Bali
 Vilas Raj as Kansa
 Sandeep Mohan as Arjuna / Nar
 Mona Parekh as Jambavati
 Shashi Sharma as Satyabhama
 Deepak Dave / Sagar Saini as Narada
 Vijay Kavish as Ugrasena / Shiva
 Amit Pachori as Shiva
 Pramod Kapoor as Kaliyug / Akrura / Jayadratha
 Girish Pardeshi as Kamadeva / Pradyumna/ Shiva/ Suryadev(in the case of Sagar Manthan)
 Manish Sharma as Pradyumna (in later episodes)
 Anupama Pardeshi as  Mohini avatar of Vishnu 
 Navneet Chaddha as Aniruddha
 Deepali Thosar as Rati
 Sunil Chauhan as Uddhava
 Mahendra Ghule as Bhim / Hanuman
 Raman Khatri as Yudhishthir
 Falguni Parikh as Draupadi
 Kumar Hegde as Duryodhan
 Govind Khatri as Karna
 Sunil Nagar as Bhishma
 Jayprakash Sharma as Shakuni
 Kanu Patel as Dronacharya / Suryadev
 Tarakesh Chauhan as Dhritarashtra
 Premchand Sharma as Pandu / Nakul
 Lata Haya as Kunti
 Sonia Kapoor as Subhadra
 Dinesh Anand / Deepak Jethi as Dushasan
 Jyotin Dave as Indra / King Shalya/ Sage Garga
 Jharna Dave as Bhanamati / Hidimba / Devi Durga for an episode
 Radhakrishna Dutta as Maharishi Uttang /Devshilpi Vishwakarma / Jarasandh
 Mukul Nag as Sudama / Ashwatthama / Brahman
 Prairna Agrawal as Vasundhara
 Raj Premi as Shishupala/Hiranyakashipu/ Jaya
 Gautam Chaturvedi as Paundraka Vasudeva 
 Anuj Sharma as Abhimanyu
 Arun Mathur as Shambarasura
 Shakti Singh / Unknown as Banasura
 Unknown as Maharani Vrinda (Wife of Banasura and Mother of Uṣā)
 Unknown as Maharani Sumati (Wife of Vajranabh and Mother of Prabhavati)
 Basheer Khan as Bhaumasura / Dwivida Banar / Mayasura(Shambarasur’s son)/ Maya Danava
 Sanjeev Siddharth as Narakasura
 Arvind Singh Rausariya as Kāla Yavana/Sage Sheshirāyana(also known as Gārgyat Muni, father of Kaal Yavana and Rājguru of Trigart kingdom) /Shambharasura's Rājguru/Vajranābha
 N. Jitendra as Kripa
 Bhakti Narula as Tara
 Neel Kamal as Kumbhaketu (Shambarasura’s Son)
 Pradeep Nishit as Maharaj Drupad / Maharishi Ved Vyas / Maharishi Parshuram
 Niharika Bhatt as Māyāvati / Vajranābha's Grandmother
 Neela Patel as Gandhari
 Vijay Sharma as Vidura
 Swati Anand as Revati (Wife of Balram and Granddaughter of King Rewat) / Chitralekha / Shikhandi / second wife of king Brihadratha of Magadh and mother of Jarasandh
 Aslam Khan in various roles
 Shyam Sunder Kalani as chanoor (3rd episode only)
 Papiya Sengupta as Lalita
 Sunil Mattoo as Kritavarma

Production
Shri Krishna was produced by Ramanand Sagar, Subhash Sagar, and Prem Sagar under the banner "Sagar Enterprises" and directed by Ramanand Sagar, Anand Sagar, and Moti Sagar. The role of young Krishna was played by Swapnil Joshi and adult Krishna was played by Sarvadaman D. Banerjee. Govind Khatri was initially roped in to play the role of Dushasan, however later ended with the role of Karna. Ravindra Jain composed music for this serial.

Re-run
The series was re-telecasted from 3 May 2020 to 16 December 2020 during the COVID-19 lockdown in India.

Episodes

See also 
 Ramayan (1987 TV series)
 Mahabharat (1988 TV series)

References

External links
 

Indian drama television series
Krishna in popular culture
DD National original programming
1993 Indian television series debuts
1997 Indian television series endings
Television series based on Mahabharata